Ammonia poisoning is a common fish disease in new aquariums, especially when immediately stocked to full capacity. Ideally, the level of ammonia (NH3) and ammonium compounds (i.e. those containing NH4+) should be zero. Although trace amounts are generally harmless, they can still lead to problems over time. Understanding the nitrogen cycle is essential for the keeping of any aquatic life. The amount of ammonia present is usually accompanied by a rise in pH. As ammonia is a base, it is stabilized by acidic water. It can cause damage to the gills at a level as small as 0.25 mg/L.

Diagnosis
A history of the tank: filter changes, power outages, excessive feeding, or the addition of microbicidal or antibiotic agents to aquarium can aid in diagnosis.  An ammonia test is the most sure way of diagnosing ammonia poisoning. 

Symptoms include: 

 Purple, red or bleeding gills
 Fish may clamp, may appear darker in color
 Red streaking on the fins or body
 Fish may gasp for air at the surface of the tank water
 Torn & jagged fins
 Fish may appear weak and lay at the bottom of the tank

Prevention

Ammonia poisoning is currently impossible to cure  however it can be prevented easily by first cycling the tank (see below). Treatments include immediately reducing the ammonia level through many small water changes. Alternatively an ammonia detoxifier can be used (try not to do this unless absolutely necessary), though such chemicals are best used in emergencies only, and do not provide a substitute for adequate tank cycling.  Once the ammonia is removed, the fish may recover if the damage is not too extensive. Increasing aeration may be desirable, as the fishes' gills are often damaged by the ammonia.  This can increase the probability of survival slightly.  Also, all other sources of stress should be removed, and the cause of the ammonia should be addressed.

Prevention (Tank Cycling)
Tank cycling is a process during which ammonia reducing bacteria are built up sufficiently to handle the tank bioload. Cycling refers to establishing bacterial colonies that regulate your nitrogen cycle, the conversion of ammonia to nitrite and finally to nitrate. There are two means of cycling a tank: Fish-In cycling whereby the fish produce waste and are the key ammonia source for the cycle and Fishless cycling whereby liquid ammonia solution or decaying fish food is used to fuel the cycle. This process can take anywhere from six to eight weeks.

See also
Ammonotelic

References

Ammonia
Fish diseases